This is a list of mosques in Luxembourg.

See also
 Islam in Luxembourg
 Lists of mosques

References

External links

 
Luxembourg
Mosques